Zeiraphera bicolora is a species of moth of the family Tortricidae. It is found in China (Jilin, Sichuan, Gansu), Japan and Russia.

References

Moths described in 1976
Eucosmini